Michael David Palance (born March 27, 1970) is an American actor and producer. He broke into acting as a teenager and his early success was established with daytime soap operas, which include One Life to Live, and Ryan’s Hope. He is also known for his starring role in the movie “Savate.”
 
He has worked as a producer for Emperor Films and was also a producer on the television film “Pop Star,” which was distributed by the Lifetime Movie Network. He is currently the executive producer of a reality TV show titled “My Hollywood.” This show is currently in production in the United States, Canada and Singapore and tracks the lives of families in different areas around the world with a focus on their experiences in the entertainment industries.

Early life
Palance was born in Long Island, New York and started taking acting classes during his years at Massapequa High School, which he graduated from in 1988. He didn't take an interest in acting until his early teenage years. A friend of the family suggested that he might try doing some modeling and this led the way to a start in acting for Palance. His initial training focused on stage work and he started working professionally during the 1980s in New York Theater and Film.

Career
His success with daytime soap operas led him to move to Los Angeles to work in various film projects and complete educational acting programs. Although he was a young teen, he was often called upon to play parts for characters that were several years older than he was. This allowed him to play a wider range of characters than he might have been able to a work on otherwise as a young teenage actor. His acting roles in the film industry eventually got him started in his work as a producer.

His most recent work involved his role as a producer on the television film “Pop Star.” He is CEO of Premiere and is currently working on the production of the reality television show “My Hollywood.”

Awards and nominations
 Nominated for soap opera digest award (1991)

References

External links
Column-Of-Life.com
Schenectady Gazette - Sep 9, 1988
NY Times - Michael Palance
OfficialPremiere.com
Michael David Palance - Google

American television producers
1970 births
Living people
Massapequa High School alumni